The Hidden Truth is a lost 1919 American silent drama film directed by Julius Steiger and starring Anna Case, an opera singer and stage star Charles Richman.

Cast
Anna Case as Helen Merrill
Charles Richman as Charles Taylor
Emma Campbell as Mrs. Collins
Forrest Robinson as Judge Blake
Grace Reals as Mrs. Blake
Thomas J. McGrane as Bill Sheridan (credited as Thomas McGrane)
John Charles as George Reed
Frank Wunderlee as Jake Codby (credited as Frank Wonderly)
Fred Hearn as 'Snipe' Roach (credited as Fred G. Hearn)
Madelyn Clare as Myrtl Cadby
William Black as The Sheriff
Davy Don as The Lumberman (credited as D. L. Don)

References

External links

1919 films
American silent feature films
Lost American films
American black-and-white films
Silent American drama films
1919 drama films
Selznick Pictures films
1919 lost films
Lost drama films
1910s American films